The 1926–27 Detroit Cougars season was the first season of National Hockey League (NHL) hockey in Detroit, Michigan. The Detroit Cougars scored 28 points, finished at the bottom of the American Division as well as the league and failed to make the playoffs in their inaugural year.

Founding
On May 15, 1926, the Townsend syndicate of investors was granted a conditional expansion NHL franchise, to begin play in the upcoming season if their arena was ready. For players, the syndicate decided to purchase one of the most successful teams from the bankrupt Western Canada Hockey League, the Victoria Cougars, who had won the Stanley Cup in 1925. On September 25, 1926, the NHL made the franchise purchase permanent, although the arena was not ready. The expansion club kept the Cougars name. The club played in Windsor for the entire season.

Regular season
Olympia Stadium wasn't finished being built in time for the 1926–27 season, so the Cougars began play in Border Cities Arena right across the Detroit River in Windsor, Ontario. The team struggled as the players adjusted to the style of play in the NHL and the team finished with only twelve wins on the season and over 80,000 USD in debt. The team's total of 28 points is the lowest total points for a season in the Detroit Red Wings' franchise history.

The team's first game, a "home" game in Windsor, was played on November 18 before a sell-out crowd of 6,000. Starting goaltender Hap Holmes took ill two hours before game time and substitute Herb Stuart gave up two goals in the first three minutes before shutting down the Boston Bruins for the rest of the game. However, Detroit could not score on Doc Stewart in the Boston net and lost 2–0.

Haldor "Slim" Halderson scored the first goal in franchise history in the third period of a loss to Pittsburgh on November 20.  The team won its first game on November 24, defeating expansion cousins Chicago Black Hawks, 1–0, in Chicago. Frank Frederickson scored the game's only goal. On November 30, Russell Oatman had the first multiple goal game in franchise history, scoring two goals in a 4–0 victory over the Maroons. In the same game, Hap Holmes recorded the first shutout in franchise history.

On January 1, 1927, the Cougars suspended Oatman and Hobie Kitchen for "breaking training." The Cougars then shook up their line-up that week by selling Oatman to the Maroons and trading Frank Fredrickson and Harry Meeking to the Bruins for Duke Keats and Archie Briden.

After 33 games, the Cougars replaced Duncan as coach with Keats. Duncan has a record of 10–21–2. Keats record was 2–7–2.

Final standings

For complete final standings, see 1926–27 NHL season

Record vs. opponents

Schedule and results

November

Record: 3–2–0; Home: 1–1–0; Road: 2–1–0

December

Record: 2–6–1; Home: 1–4–0; Road: 1–2–1

January

Record: 3–8–1; Home: 1–2–0; Road: 2–6–1

February

Record: 2–6–0; Home: 2–4–0; Road: 0–2–0

March

Record: 2–6–2; Home: 1–4–1; Road: 1–2–1

Green background indicates win.
Red background indicates regulation loss.
Yellow background indicates tie.

Playoffs

The Detroit Cougars failed to make the playoffs.

Player statistics

Scoring leaders

Note: GP = Games played; G = Goals; A = Assists; Pts = Points; +/- = Plus/minus; PIM = Penalty minutes

*Stats reflect games played with Detroit only.

Goaltending

Note: GP = Games played; TOI = Time on ice (minutes); W = Wins; L = Losses; OTL = Overtime losses; GA = Goals against; SO = Shutouts; SV% = Save percentage; GAA = Goals against average

Awards and records

Trophies and awards

Records

Milestones

Transactions
The Cougars were involved in the following transactions during the 1926–27 season.

Trades

See also
1926–27 NHL season

References
 
Notes

External links

Player stats: Detroit Red Wings player stats on hockeydb.com
Game log: Detroit Red Wings game log on detroithockey.net
Team standings: NHL standings on hockeydb.com

Detroit
Detroit
Detroit Red Wings seasons
Detroit Cougars
Detroit Cougars